The  was a basic training aircraft of the Imperial Japanese Army Air Force built by Tachikawa Aircraft Company Ltd in the 1930s. It was known to the Allies under the nickname of Cedar during World War II.

Design and development
The Ki-9 was originally planned to be manufactured in two versions using the same basic airframe, but with different engines for service as either a primary or intermediate trainer. However, when the lower-powered form proved to be unsuitable due a center of gravity issue, design of a new airframe was ordered for the basic trainer version, and was given the new designation of Ki-17.

Compared to the Ki-9, the Ki-17 had equal-span wings, a slimmer fuselage and a revised tailplane. It was powered by a  Hitachi Ha-13a radial engine. The first prototype flew in July 1935.

The only major change made to subsequent production aircraft was the deletion of the upper-wing ailerons to eliminate oversensitive control inputs.

Operational history
The Ki-17 was introduced to service as the Army Type 95-3 Basic Grade Trainer Model A under the former aircraft naming nomenclature system. Tachikawa manufactured 560 Ki-17s between 1936 and 1943 and the type saw service with the Army Air Academy and flight training schools.

Operators

 Kumagaya Army Flying Training School
 Mito Army Flying Training School
 Tachiari Army Flying Training School
 Utsonomiya Army Flying Training School
 Imperial Japanese Army Air Force Academy (Rikugun Kōku Shikan Gakkō)

 Royal Thai Air Force

Specifications (Ki-17)

See also

References

Notes

Bibliography

  (new edition 1987 by Putnam Aeronautical Books, .)

Biplanes
Ki-17, Tachikawa
Ki-17
Single-engined tractor aircraft
Aircraft first flown in 1935